WGNC-FM (88.5 FM) is a radio station licensed to Constantine, Michigan, United States. The station airs a Christian country music format and is currently owned by Progressive Broadcasting System.

References

External links
WGNC-FM's website

GNC-FM